The Haunted Island, a Frog Detective Game, is a 2018 first-person comedy adventure video game created by independent Australian developer Grace Bruxner. In it, the player plays as a detective frog, named "Frog Detective".

A sequel entitled Frog Detective 2: The Case of the Invisible Wizard was released on December 9, 2019. The final installment of the series, Frog Detective 3: Corruption at Cowboy County, was released on October 27, 2022.

Plot
The Haunted Island begins with Frog Detective getting a call from their supervisor, who informs them that a ghost has been heard on the island. Frog Detective grabs their magnifying glass and goes to the island, where they meet several people, including Martin, the owner of the island who first heard the ghost, and Larry, who insists he is not the ghost. Larry then informs Frog Detective that the ghost noises are coming from the cave nearby. Martin also informs Frog Detective that he is planning a dance party the next day with his friend Finley, who lives off the island. However, an explosive device is needed to enter the cave. Frog Detective begins collecting the items needed to create an explosive device from the residents of the island. After collecting all the needed materials, Frog Detective is able to enter the cave. Inside, Frog Detective finds Finley, practicing dancing. It turns out that the ghostly noises were coming from Finley's radio. Finley and Frog Detective leave the cave and talk to Martin, and they all agree that books should never be trusted. Finley, Frog Detective and Martin then decide to move the contest from the next day to the current day. All the residents of the island then dance and the player is able to choose the winner.

Gameplay 

The Haunted Island's gameplay revolves around collecting the ingredients needed for an explosive device, to see if a ghost is inside a cave. Frog Detective is able to converse with several characters, such as the scientists Fresh X and MysteryMonkey.

Development 
The Haunted Island took around five months to develop. Grace Bruxner aimed to subvert the detective genre as she created the game, which she had felt had become largely dominated by media such as Agatha Christie's Poirot and L.A. Noire. She also did research into the cinematography and camera angles of the detective genre to use in The Haunted Island, as she felt that the camera angles used in those pieces of media are extremely serious as compared to The Haunted Island, and using them would create comedy due to the mismatch in tone. Additionally, she tried to avoid writing characters that relied on offensive stereotypes.

Bruxner claims that she made around 7,000 dollars from the game on its first month on the market. After the game was released, Superhot, the company that created the eponymous Superhot, a first-person shooter video game, gave funding to developer Grace Bruxner for use in developing this game's sequel, Frog Detective 2: The Case of the Invisible Wizard. Superhot said that the funding constituted the "crossover no one asked for".

Reception

The game received "mixed or average" reviews according to Metacritic. Destructoids Kevin Mersereau called it "pretty gosh darn rad."

The game's humor was praised by critics. Kotakus Cameron Kunzelman called it "really, really funny", comparing it to a Wes Anderson film. Vices Danielle Riendeau favorably compared it to Donut County, which they said is "another game that is really funny without trying too hard."

Mersereau praised the games graphics, saying that it is "suitably goofy", and "gels wonderfully with the whole aesthetic."

The Haunted Island was nominated for best student game at the Independent Games Festival.

External links 
Official website

References

2018 video games
Adventure games
MacOS games
Video games about amphibians
Video games developed in Australia
Video games set on fictional islands
Video games with cel-shaded animation
Windows games
Detective video games